The Presbyterian Church in Korea (JeongTongChongHap) was founded by Pastor Park In-Soo. Later he joined the JongHap Presbyterian church. In 1983 he and his supporters founded the JeongTongChongHap. The Apostles Creed and Westminster Confession are the recognised standards. In 2004 it had 60,000 members and 120 congregations.

References 

Presbyterian denominations in Asia
Presbyterian denominations in South Korea